Folk Song: Utahime Jojouka (フォーク・ソング〜歌姫抒情歌) is the cover album by Japanese singer Akina Nakamori. It was released on 24 December 2008 under the Universal Music Japan. It is Nakamori's fifth cover album.

Background
Unlike previous cover album, this album was produced by Yuuji Toriyama.  The album was released in the six editions with different cover jackets inspired by Andrew Warhol's piece Marilyn Diptych (1962), which portrays Marilyn Monroe (aside from the regular edition). The limited edition "A" includes DVD disc with recording footage of the album.

The album consist of folk songs that were released in Japan during 1970s.

Stage performances
In 2009, Nakamori performed Watashi wa Naiteimasu, Muenzaka, 22Sai no Wakare, Ame no Monogatari and Koi in the special live Akina Nakamori Special Live 2009 “Empress at Yokohama”. The DVD footage was released on 8 August 2010.

Chart performance
Folk Song: Utahime Jojouka debuted at number 30 on the Oricon Album Weekly Chart, charted for 7 weeks and sold over 18,000 copies.

Track listing

References

2008 albums
Japanese-language albums
Akina Nakamori albums
Universal Music Japan albums